Sir Michael Jon Neubert (3 September 1933 – 3 January 2014)  was Conservative MP for Romford from 1974 until 1997. His loss in the landslide 1997 general election was considered something of a surprise.

He was educated at Bromley Grammar School and Downing College, Cambridge and worked as a travel and industrial consultant. He was a local councillor and alderman in Bromley 1960–1974 being council leader for a time and Mayor of Bromley in 1972.

He contested the parliamentary seat of Hammersmith North in 1966, and Romford in 1970, before being elected in February 1974. From 1983 he held several junior government posts, and was Under-Secretary of State for Defence Procurement at the Ministry of Defence 1989–1990.

In April 1990 he visited Gruinard Island to declare the island safe after World War II Anthrax experiments.

Personal life
Neubert and his wife, Sally, had one son. He died on 3 January 2014, exactly 4 months after his 80th birthday, in Cheltenham, Gloucestershire, England.

References

External links 
 

1933 births
2014 deaths
Knights Bachelor
Alumni of Downing College, Cambridge
Conservative Party (UK) MPs for English constituencies
Councillors in Greater London
Councillors in the London Borough of Bromley
UK MPs 1974
UK MPs 1974–1979
UK MPs 1979–1983
UK MPs 1983–1987
UK MPs 1987–1992
UK MPs 1992–1997
Politicians awarded knighthoods